Conotalis is a genus of moths of the family Crambidae.

Species
Species:
Conotalis aurantifascia (Hampson, 1896)
Conotalis nigrisquamalis Hampson, 1919
Conotalis nigroradians (Mabille, 1900)

References

Crambinae
Crambidae genera
Taxa named by George Hampson